Drolet is a surname. Notable people with the surname include:

Adine Fafard-Drolet (1876–1963), Canadian singer and founder of a conservatory
André Drolet, politician in the Canadian province of Quebec
Antoine Drolet, politician in Quebec, Canada and a Member of the National Assembly of Quebec
Charles Drolet (1795–1873), Quebec lawyer and political figure
François Drolet (born 1972), Canadian short track speed skater
Joseph-Toussaint Drolet (1786–1838), merchant, seigneur and political figure in Lower Canada
Leon Drolet (born 1967), Michigan Republican politician and political activist with libertarian views
Marie-Ève Drolet (born 1982), Canadian short track speed skater
Michele Drolet, American cross-country skier
Nancy Drolet (born 1973), Canadian ice hockey player
René Drolet (born 1944), retired Canadian professional ice hockey centre

See also
Lac-Drolet, Quebec, village of 1,100 people in Le Granit Regional County Municipality in the Estrie region in Quebec, Canada